The Bamburgh Baronetcy, of Howsham in the County of York, was a title in the Baronetage of England. It was created on 1 December 1619 for William Bamburgh, High Sheriff of Yorkshire from 1607 to 1608. The title became extinct on the early death of his younger son, the third Baronet, in 1631.

Bamburgh baronets, of Howsham (1619)
Sir William Bamburgh, 1st Baronet (died 1623)
Sir Thomas Bamburgh, 2nd Baronet (1607–1624)
Sir John Bamburgh, 3rd Baronet (1613–1631)

References

Extinct baronetcies in the Baronetage of England